Noble Township is located in Richland County, Illinois. As of the 2010 census, its population was 1,430 and it contained 645 housing units.

Geography

Demographics

References

External links
City-data.com
Illinois State Archives

Townships in Richland County, Illinois
Townships in Illinois